Denis Kurian (born in Minsk) is a Belarusian journalist and television presenter. In particular, he was the host of the Junior Eurovision Song Contest 2010, which was held in Minsk (together with Leila Ismailava).

References

External links 
 

Journalists from Minsk
Living people
Belarusian people of Armenian descent
Belarusian television presenters
1984 births